Veliko Trgovišće is a village and municipality in  Krapina-Zagorje County in Croatia located just south-west from nearby town Zabok.

Population

In the 2011 census, there were a total of 4,945 inhabitants in the municipality, in the following settlements:
 Bezavina, population 108
 Domahovo, population 385
 Družilovec, population 472
 Dubrovčan, population 807
 Jalšje, population 367
 Jezero Klanječko, population 225
 Mrzlo Polje, population 215
 Požarkovec, population 112
 Ravnice, population 316
 Strmec, population 167
 Turnišće Klanječko, population 50
 Velika Erpenja, population 111
 Veliko Trgovišće, population 1,250
 Vilanci, population 123
 Vižovlje, population 237

History
In the late 19th and early 20th century, Veliko Trgovišće was part of Varaždin County in the Kingdom of Croatia-Slavonia.

People
Croatian President Franjo Tuđman was born in Veliko Trgovišće in 1922, when it was part of the Kingdom of Serbs, Croats and Slovenes.

References

External links

Populated places in Krapina-Zagorje County
Municipalities of Croatia
Franjo Tuđman